Reyad Ellafi  (born 5 July 1980 in Tripoli, Libya) is a Libyan footballer. He currently plays for Al-Ittihad.

Ellafi is also a member of the Libya national football team, and played in the 2009 African Championship of Nations.

References

External links

1983 births
Living people
Libyan footballers
Libya international footballers
Association football forwards
Al-Ahli SC (Tripoli) players
Al-Ittihad Club (Tripoli) players
Al-Nasr SC (Benghazi) players
Libyan Premier League players